Kinne Cemetery, also known as the Glasgo Cemetery and Old Kinne Burying Ground, is a historic cemetery in Jarvis Road in Griswold, Connecticut. The earliest marked stone is for Daniel Kinne who died in 1713. In the 1930s, the inscriptions of 79 stones in the Kinne Cemetery were recorded for the Hale Index. There are around 80 fieldstones with no carving or identification, but it is unknown if this stems from wearing of the gneiss stone or that there were no skilled carvers locally available. The seven carvers that have been identified are Lebbeus Kimball, Jotham Warren, Josiah Manning, Peter Barker, Mr. Huntington of Lebanon, E. Marston of Mystic Bridge and O. Doty of Stonington. The National Historic Register of Places nomination notes, "the cemetery is significant artistically because the carving on the stones gives many good examples of the funerary art that was characteristic of the 18th and 19th centuries in New England." The cemetery is notable because of the burial of Isaac C. Glasko, the namesake of the village of Glasgo, and a prominent African American land-holding man who ran a blacksmith shop that was important to the marine industry of the area. The cemetery was made a part of the Connecticut Freedom Trail in 1995 and it was added to the National Register of Historic Places on April 12, 2001.

History 
Established around 1713, the Kinne Cemetery is one of eighteen family cemeteries in Griswold. It rests upon the land of Joseph Kinne, who came to Griswold from Salem, Massachusetts in 1704 and includes the land of Thomas Kinne, also came from Salem in 1714. The exact date of its founding is unknown, but the earliest extant stone is for Daniel Kinne, died 1713. According to the National Register of Historic Places nomination, the cemetery was an active burial site for the Kinne family, including those of married Kinne daughters, until the interment of Clark Robbins Cook in 1912. However, the Hale Index lists the last marked interment as that of Herbert Kinney, died August 24, 1916.

In order to improve and enlarge the cemetery, the Kinne Historical and Genealogical Society was incorporated by special act of the Connecticut General Assembly in 1884. The land's grantor, Nathan B. Lewis, purchased the land thirty years prior in 1857 from a Kinne family connection, Alexander Steward. According to the Town of Griswold's records, the property is designated as "map 78, block 136, lot 3". In the 1930s, the inscriptions of 79 stones in the Kinne Cemetery were recorded for the Hale Index. According to another study, 71 of the 74 interments are related by blood or marriage to the Kinne family.

In the Summer of 1999, a group of volunteers worked to restore and clean up the cemetery that led to a ceremony in October 1999 with more than 60 people in attendance. The article in The Day highlighted the difficulty in finding the cemetery which is located on the banks of the Pachaug River, in the village of Glasgo, located in the town of Griswold. Iva Arpin said that the town would repair the stone walls and that the Children of the American Revolution would return in the spring to continue their work on the cemetery. In 2002, the cemetery had undergone a significant restoration which included the unearthing and accounting for all the burial markers that had been strewn about the grounds. Arpin noted that some of the stones showed signs of vandalism. The Day described how some of the marker stones and monuments were covered in nearly a foot of pine needles and that the roots had uprooted the anchor stones causing the headstones to fall and break.

By 2007, concerns about public use of the land for recreation and reflection had provoked concern from Kinne descendants, but there is little that descendants could do. The grounds were once under the control of the Kinne Family Historical Society, but it was disbanded "generations ago" and the town owns the cemetery by default. The cemetery had been disturbed by the gravestones being stacked to "help climbers reach their optimum height before swinging" from a rope on a tree into the pond. Pieces of the wall and a gravestone had been thrown towards the pond and came to rest on a ledge. Courtland Kinne, a descendant of Thomas Kinne, wants a jersey barrier erected to stop vehicles from parking next to the gravestones, the wrought iron fence around the burial ground and the trees within the grounds to be removed because their roots could disturb the plots.

Importance 
The Kinne Cemetery shows the evolution of funerary art over the course of the centuries. The earliest marked stone is for Daniel Kinne who died in 1713. Daniel Kinne's stone has a simple rounded top with only his name carved into it.

Interments 
This is an alphabetical list of interments recorded from the Hale Index survey with all data stemming from a copy of the Charles R. Hale Collection of Cemetery Inscriptions. Additional field stones are noted, but were not listed in the Hale Collection. According to the National Historic Register, names are missing from this list, including Isaac C. Glasko (1776-1861) who was "of mixed Indian and
Negro blood." The listing here is not complete because the records of many field stones were incomplete and did not contain identification, including the earliest stone for Daniel Kinne who died in 1713. Kinne's stone only had the name carved.

Gallery

See also
National Register of Historic Places listings in New London County, Connecticut

References

1713 establishments in Connecticut
Buildings and structures in New London County, Connecticut
Cemeteries on the National Register of Historic Places in Connecticut
Griswold, Connecticut
National Register of Historic Places in New London County, Connecticut